Opsotheresia bigelowi is a species of bristle fly in the family Tachinidae.

Distribution
Canada, United States.

References

Dexiinae
Diptera of North America
Taxa named by Charles Howard Curran
Insects described in 1926